Serguei Prado Sañudo (born 9 March 1974) is a Cuban retired footballer.

Club career
A burly but prolific striker, he played his entire career for local side Villa Clara, except for a season in the Norwegian third tier with Fløy alongside compatriot Osmín Hernández.

Back in Cuba, he was the league's top goalscorer in 2003 and 2005. He is the Cuban league's all-time top goalscorer with 126.

International career
Prado made his international debut for Cuba in a May 1999 Caribbean Cup qualification match against Bermuda and has earned a total of 30 caps, scoring 12 goals. He represented his country in 6 FIFA World Cup qualification matches (1 goal). To his disappointment, he was never included for a CONCACAF Gold Cup final tournament.

His final international was a January 2005 CONCACAF Gold Cup qualifier against Haiti.

International goals
Scores and results list Cuba's goal tally first.

Futsal management
In 2014, Prado took charge of the Villa Clara futsal team after coaching the Deportivo Anzoátegui futsal team in Venezuela for two years.

References

External links
 

1974 births
Living people
People from Santa Clara, Cuba
Association football forwards
Cuban footballers
Cuba international footballers
FC Villa Clara players
Flekkerøy IL players
Cuban expatriate footballers
Expatriate footballers in Norway
Cuban expatriate sportspeople in Norway
Cuban expatriate sportspeople in Venezuela